The Real World: Las Vegas is the twelfth season of MTV's reality television series The Real World, which focuses on a group of diverse strangers living together for several months in a different city each season, as cameras follow their lives and interpersonal relationships. It is the first season to be filmed in the Mountain States region of the United States, specifically in Nevada.

The season featured seven people who lived in a converted penthouse suite on the 28th floor of the Las Vegas Palms Casino and Resort, which production started from February 13 until June 21, 2002. The season premiered on September 17 of that year, consisted of 28 episodes, which along with the Denver season, is the highest number to date. This was the first of three seasons of The Real World to be filmed in Las Vegas. The show made a return to the city twice: in the twenty-fifth and  the thirty-first seasons, the latter set in Downtown Las Vegas.

Due to the popularity of the season, MTV ordered the spin-off miniseries Reunited: The Real World Las Vegas that reunited the cast to live in the same Palms Hotel and Casino suite they filmed the original series in, five years after filming ended on The Real World: Las Vegas.

The residence

The owner of The Palms Casino Hotel, where the season was filmed, asked for production to cast exclusively people over 21 years old. Thus this was the first season in which all the castmates were at least that old.

The Palms demolished six rooms to make the hotel suite in which the season was filmed, at a cost of over $2 million USD. It was designed by Sharmila Tankha of the Jerde Partnership, the same firm that designed the hotel itself. Unlike previous Real World residences, the suite is not decorated with IKEA furnishings.

The suite, which is now called "The Real World Suite", is one of few former Real World residences that not only overall remains in the condition in which it was used for filming (minor changes have been made, such as the addition of doors for the bedrooms, TV's and the removal of the Confessional), but in which the public can potentially reside. The hotel rents the suite for $11,200 a night (including tax), and has done so to numerous celebrities who have stayed there. Among them are Britney Spears, who stayed in the suite on New Year's Eve 2004.

Assignment
Most seasons of The Real World, beginning with the fifth, have included the assignment of a season-long group job or task to the housemates, continued participation in which has been mandatory to remain part of the cast since the Back to New York season. The Las Vegas housemates had various jobs throughout the season involving the Palms Casino and Resort in which they lived, including promotional work for the night club, Rain in the Desert, cocktail waiting, and go-go dancing.

Cast

: Age at the time of filming.

Episodes

After filming
After the cast left the Real World suite, six of them, except for Trishelle, appeared to discuss their experiences both during and since their time on the show, 7 The Hard Way: The Real World Las Vegas Reunion which premiered on April 8, 2003, and was hosted by Hilarie Burton.

At the 2008 The Real World Awards Bash, Steven, Trishelle and Brynn took home the award for "Steamiest Scene". Irulan and Trishelle were also nominated for "Hottest Female", Alton for "Hottest Male", Brynn and Steven for "Best Fight", Alton and Irulan for "Favorite Love Story" (Steven and Trishelle were nominated in the same category as well).

Trishelle Cannatella appeared in the May 2002 Playboy magazine with other Real World alumni. Arissa Hill also posed for the magazine. In 2003 Trishelle was a cast member on The Surreal Life, and has played in the Lingerie Bowl, and in Hulk Hogan's Celebrity Championship Wrestling series as "The Red Hot Redneck". She also appeared on Fear Factor alongside Mike Mizanin, and at poker events. She married John Hensz in 2017. Katie Doyle from Road Rules: The Quest was in attendance.

Steven Hill married designer Donna Katz in 2007 and welcomed his first son, Riley James David, in 2008. The couple divorced in 2010.

Irulan Wilson and Alton Williams' relationship continued for three years after the show. Williams later became a radio host, while Wilson appeared in various documentaries and TV specials like Kill Reality and Real Hot. She now works as a photographer in New York City.

In 2005, Trishelle Cannatella, Steven Hill, Irulan Wilson and Tonya Cooley (from The Real World: Chicago) appeared in the TV movie, The Scorned.

In 2007, the cast reunited to appear in Reunited: The Real World Las Vegas, a seven-episode spin-off reunion miniseries in which they lived in the same suite they filmed the original series in. The mini-series premiered on May 30, 2007 and concluded on July 11, 2007.

The Challenge

Challenge in bold indicates the contestant was a finalist on the Challenge.

References

External links
Official site
"The Real World: Las Vegas: Full Episode Synopses and Recaps". MTV.
"The Real World: Las Vegas: Meet the Cast". MTV.

Las Vegas
Television shows set in the Las Vegas Valley
2002 American television seasons
2003 American television seasons
Palms Casino Resort
Television shows shot in the Las Vegas Valley